Poste San Marino (before 2012: Poste Sammarinesi) is the company responsible for postal service in San Marino.

History 

It was established on 7 October 1607, with the first stamps printed in 1877.

San Marino originally joined the Universal Postal Union on 7 January 1915.

It became a Società per azioni (S.p.a.), or public company, in 2016.

Post Offices 
Acquaviva - Via Fabrizio da Montebello, 5
Borgo Maggiore - Piazza Grande, 25
Chiesanuova - Via Corrado Forti, 64
Città di San Marino - Via Gino Giacomini, 69
Dogana - Piazza Marino Tini, 3
Domagnano - Piazza Filippo da Sterpeto, 3
Fiorentino - Via la Rena, 19
Faetano - Strada della Croce, 48
Montegiardino - Via del Dragone, 17
Serravalle - Via Coluccio Salutati, 3
Arrivi e partenze - Strada Borrana, 32 - Serravalle

See also

Postage stamps and postal history of San Marino

References

External links

 (in Italian) (English link on website not operational- per failed attempt to access)

Communications in San Marino
San Marino